Yuri Viktorovich Borovskoy (born 11 June 1971) is a former Russian professional football referee and a player.

Club career
As a player, he made his professional debut in the Soviet First League in 1989 for FC SKA Rostov-on-Don.

Referee career
He refereed third-tier PFL from 2003 to 2010.

European club competitions
With FC Rostselmash Rostov-on-Don.

 UEFA Intertoto Cup 1999: 2 games.
 UEFA Intertoto Cup 2000: 2 games.

References

1971 births
Sportspeople from Rostov-on-Don
Living people
Soviet footballers
Russian footballers
Association football defenders
Russian Premier League players
Russian football referees
FC SKA Rostov-on-Don players
FC Rostov players
FC Tyumen players
FC Kuban Krasnodar players